Sappemeer is a town in the Dutch province of Groningen. It is located in the municipality of Midden-Groningen to the east of Hoogezand.

Sappemeer was a separate municipality until 1949, when it merged with Hoogezand. The village is the European headquarters of the Japanese Kikkoman Corporation, which began operations in 1997 and now produces over 400 million litres of soy sauce per annum at the site.

Dutch physician and feminist Aletta Jacobs was born in the village.

The Sappemeer Oost railway station is located in the village.

Gallery

References

External links

Former municipalities of Groningen (province)
Populated places in Groningen (province)
Midden-Groningen